La Garita Caldera is a large caldera in the San Juan volcanic field in the San Juan Mountains around the town of Creede in southwestern Colorado, United States. It is west of La Garita, Colorado. The eruption that created the La Garita Caldera is among the largest known volcanic eruptions in Earth's history, as well as being one of the most powerful known supervolcanic events.

Date

Area devastated
The area devastated by the La Garita eruption is thought to have covered a significant portion of what is now Colorado. The deposit, known as the Fish Canyon Tuff, covered at least . The eruption might have formed a large-area ash-fall, but none has yet been identified.

Size of eruption
The scale of La Garita volcanism was the second greatest of the Cenozoic Era. By contrast, the most powerful human-made explosive device ever detonated, the Tsar Bomba, had a yield of 50 megatons, whereas the eruption at La Garita was about 5,000 times more energetic. However, because Tsar Bomba's reaction was complete within nanoseconds, while a volcanic explosion can take seconds or minutes, the power of the events is comparable if measured within the respective bounded timeframes.

The Fish Canyon eruption was the second most energetic event to have occurred on Earth since the Cretaceous–Paleogene extinction event 66 million years ago. The asteroid impact responsible for that mass-extinction, equivalent to 100 teratons of TNT, was approximately 420 times more powerful than the Fish Canyon eruption.

Geology

The Fish Canyon Tuff, made of dacite, is uniform in its petrological composition and forms a single cooling unit despite the huge volume. Dacite is a silicic volcanic rock common in explosive eruptions, lava domes and short thick lava flows. There are also large intracaldera lavas composed of andesite, a volcanic rock compositionally intermediate between basalt (poor in silica content) and dacite (higher silica content) in the La Garita Caldera.

The caldera itself, like the eruption of Fish Canyon Tuff, is large in scale. Many calderas of explosive origin are slightly ovoid or oblong in shape. Because of the vast scale and erosion, it took scientists over 30 years to fully determine the size of the caldera. La Garita is considered an extinct volcano.

La Garita is also the source of at least seven major eruptions of welded tuff deposits over a span of 1.5 million years since the Fish Canyon Tuff eruption. The caldera is also known to have extensive outcrops of a very unusual lava-like rock unit, called the Pagosa Peak Dacite, made of dacite that is very similar to that of the Fish Canyon Tuff. The Pagosa Peak Dacite, which has characteristics of both lava and welded tuff, was likely erupted shortly before the Fish Canyon Tuff. These rocks were identified as lava because the unit has a highly elongated shape (1:50) and very high viscosity of the crystal-rich magma similar to those of flow-layered silicic lava. The Pagosa Peak Dacite formed by low-column pyroclastic fountaining and lateral transport as dense, poorly-inflated pyroclastic flows.

See also

 Wheeler Geologic Area
 Yellowstone Caldera
 Toba Supereruption
 List of largest volcanic eruptions

References

Bibliography
   (includes maps, photo collection, and links to on-line abstracts)
 
 
 Largest explosive eruptions: New results for the 27.8 Ma Fish Canyon Tuff and the La Garita caldera, San Juan volcanic field, Colorado
 The Mid-Tertiary Ignimbrite Flare-Up

External links
 USGS Hawaiian Volcano Observatory: Supersized eruptions are all the rage!
 Maps:
 
 
 

Volcanoes of Colorado
La Garita Caldera
Extinct volcanoes
Geology of the Rocky Mountains
La Garita Caldera
Calderas of Colorado
Supervolcanoes
VEI-8 volcanoes
Oligocene calderas
Oligocene North America
La Garita Caldera